"Miles from Nowhere" is a song by The Smithereens.

Miles from Nowhere may also refer to:

Miles from Nowhere, novel by Nami Mun 2009
Miles from Nowhere (1992 film), directed by Buzz Kulik starring Ricky Schroder and James Farentino
Miles from Nowhere, working title of 2009 TV movie Chasing a Dream
"Miles from Nowhere", a song by Cat Stevens from the album Tea for the Tillerman